Kambarage Stadium is a multi-use stadium in Shinyanga, Tanzania.  It is currently used mostly for football matches and serves as the home venue for Kahama United.  It currently holds 30,000 people.

References

World Stadiums

Football venues in Tanzania
Buildings and structures in the Shinyanga Region